This is a list of state parks and reserves in the New Mexico state park system.  The system began with the establishment of Bottomless Lakes State Park on November 18, 1933.  New Mexico currently has 35 state parks.  It has been calculated that 70% of the state's population lives within  of a New Mexico state park.  The system as a whole saw 4.5 million visitors in 2009.  The parks are managed by the New Mexico State Parks Division of the New Mexico Energy, Minerals and Natural Resources Department.  The mission of the State Parks Division is to "protect and enhance natural and cultural resources, provide first-class recreational and education facilities and opportunities, and promote public safety to benefit and enrich the lives of visitors."

See also
List of National Parks of the United States

References

External links
 New Mexico State Parks Division
 New Mexico State Parks Foundation

New Mexico state parks
 
State parks